Jasper James is a British television producer, director and screenwriter. He is well known as the co-creator of several of the Walking with... series.

Work 
 Tomorrow's World (1993) - director
 Future Fantastic (1996) - producer
 Walking with Dinosaurs (1999) - producer, director
 The Making of Walking with Dinosaurs (1999) - producer, director
 Walking with Beasts (2001) - series producer
 Walking with Beasts Special: Triumph of the Beasts (2001) - producer
 Walking with Beasts Special: The Beast Within (2001) - writer, producer
 Chased by Dinosaurs (2002) - producer, writer, director of Land of Giants episode
 Sea Monsters (2003) - director
 The Story of 1 (2005) - executive producer
 T-Rex: A Dinosaur in Hollywood (2005) - executive producer
 Perfect Disaster (2006) - executive producer
 Prehistoric Park (2006) - executive producer
 March of the Dinosaurs (2011) - writer, executive producer
 Titanoboa: Monster Snake (2012) - executive producer
 Information Age (2014) - writer, executive producer
 Size Matters (2018) - executive producer
 Hey You! What If? (2020) - executive producer

Bibliography 
 Chased by Sea Monsters by Nigel Marven and Jasper James, DK ADULT, 2004, 
 Prehistoric Park with Poster adapted by Susan Evento, created by Jasper James, Meredith Books, 2007,

References

External links 
 Jasper James profile at LinkedIn
 

British television producers
20th-century births
Living people
Year of birth missing (living people)
Walking with...